The North American Development Bank (NADBank) is a binational financial institution capitalized and governed equally by the Federal Governments of the United States of America and Mexico to provide financing to support the development and implementation of infrastructure projects.

History
The NADBank was established by the Border Environment Cooperation Agreement of November 1993 (Agreement Between the Government of the United States of America and the Government of the United Mexican States Concerning the Establishment of a Border Environment Cooperation Commission and a North American Development Bank.)

In the United States, participation by the government was authorized by North American Free Trade Agreement Implementation Act § 541.

References

External links
The North American Development Bank website
The BECC website

Banking in Mexico
Mexico–United States relations
Environment of the United States
Environment of Mexico
Economy of North America
Banks based in Texas
North American Free Trade Agreement
Intergovernmental environmental organizations
Development finance institutions